The 1982 NCAA Rifle Championships were contested at the third annual tournament to determine the team and individual national champions of NCAA co-ed collegiate rifle shooting in the United States. The championship was held at the Virginia Military Institute in Lexington, Virginia during March 1982. 

Tennessee Tech, with a team score of 6,138, once again won the team title; the Golden Eagles finished ahead of West Virginia, runners-up for the third consecutive year, with a score of 6,136. Tennessee Tech was coached by James Newkirk.

Both individual champions were repeat winners from the previous year: Kurt Fitz-Randolph (Tennessee Tech) for smallbore rifle and John Rost (West Virginia) for air rifle.

Qualification
Since there is only one national collegiate championship for rifle shooting, all NCAA rifle programs (whether from Division I, Division II, or Division III) were eligible. A total of 9 teams ultimately contested this championship.

Results
Scoring:  The championship consisted of 120 shots by each competitor in smallbore and 40 shots per competitor in air rifle.

Team title

Individual events

References

NCAA Rifle Championship
NCAA Rifle Championships
1982 in shooting sports
NCAA Rifle Championships